The Baluchistan Agency (also spelt Balochistan Agency) was one of agencies of India during the colonial era. It was located in the present-day Pakistani Balochistan province.

Geography 
The territories of the agency covered an area of 347,064 km2 (134,002 square miles) and included areas which had been acquired by lease or otherwise brought under direct British control, as well as the princely states.

History 
This political agency was established in 1877, following the 1876 treaty signed in Mastung by Baloch leaders by means of which they accepted the mediation of the British authorities in their disputes.

Colonel Sir Robert Groves Sandeman introduced an innovative system of tribal pacification in Balochistan that was in effect from 1877 to 1947. However the Government of India generally opposed his Methods and refused to allow it to operate in India's North West Frontier. Historians have long debated its scope and effectiveness in the peaceful spread of Imperial influence.

Demographics

Religion

Districts

Princely States

Cities

Castes and tribes

Princely states 
The Baluchistan Agency consisted of three princely states:
 Kalat khanate, the premier state and only salute state (Hereditary salute of 19-guns; titles Wali, Khan; from 1739 Wali, Begler Begi, Khan), including its Jhalawan, Kacchi and Sarawan administrative divisions
 while Makran (title Nazem, later Nawwab) is quoted as either another division, a vassal state or autonomous
 and Kalat's two feudatory states :
 Las Bela (title Jam Saheb)
 Kharan (title Mir; from 1921, Sardar Bahador Nawwab).
The Government of India maintained its relations with the states through its political agent in Kalat. The first agent in Balochistan was Robert Groves Sandeman (1835-1892), Knight Commander of the Order of the Star of India, who was appointed by Lord Lytton, the Viceroy of India.

Administrative structure 

In addition to the princely states, the north of the agency was administered as the  Chief Commissioner's Province. This consisted of the following districts:
  Chagai
  Quetta-Pishin (including Quetta)
  Jhatpat
  Loralai
  Sibi (including Bugti and Marri tribal areas)
  Zhob

See also 
 History of Balochistan
 List of Indian Princely States
 Treaty of Kalat

Notes

References 

Agencies of British India
Khanate of Kalat
1877 establishments in India